Gary Bernard Collier (born 4 February 1955) is an English former professional footballer who played as a central defender. Active in both England and the United States, Collier made over 500 career league appearances.

Career
Born in Bristol, Collier played in the Football League for Bristol City and Coventry City between 1972 and 1980, making a total of 195 league appearances. In 1980, Collier moved to the United States, to play for the Portland Timbers in the North American Soccer League. In 1982, the Timbers collapsed and Collier moved as a free agent to the San Diego Sockers for the 1982-1983 Major Indoor Soccer League season. He would play two outdoor and four indoor seasons for the Sockers. In February 1987, the Sockers sold Collier's contract to the Kansas City Comets for $5,000. The Comets released him at the end of the season and he signed as a free agent with the Chicago Sting. The Sting released Collier in June 1988, just before the team collapsed.  In 1990, he replaced Derek Armstrong as head coach of the San Diego Nomads in the American Professional Soccer League. In addition to coaching, Collier also played on the Nomads' backline that year.

References

External links
 
 NASL/MISL career stats

1955 births
Living people
American Professional Soccer League coaches
American Professional Soccer League players
English football managers
English footballers
English expatriate footballers
Bristol City F.C. players
Chicago Sting (MISL) players
Coventry City F.C. players
Kansas City Comets (original MISL) players
Major Indoor Soccer League (1978–1992) players
North American Soccer League (1968–1984) indoor players
North American Soccer League (1968–1984) players
Portland Timbers (1975–1982) players
Nomads Soccer Club players
San Diego Sockers (NASL) players
San Diego Sockers (original MISL) players
English Football League players
Association football central defenders
English expatriate sportspeople in the United States
Expatriate soccer players in the United States
Footballers from Bristol